Alan Joseph Joyce,  (born 30 June 1966) is an Irish-Australian businessman. He is the chief executive officer (CEO) of Qantas Airways Limited.

Early life and education
Joyce was born and raised in Tallaght, now a suburb of Dublin, Ireland. His mother was a cleaner, and his father worked in a tobacco factory. Joyce attended secondary school at St Mark's Community School in Springfield, Tallaght.

Joyce attended Dublin Institute of Technology and Trinity College Dublin. He graduated with Honours, receiving a Bachelor of Science degree in Applied Science (Physics and Mathematics) and a Master of Science degree in Management Science. He is a Fellow of the Royal Aeronautical Society.

Career
In 1988, Joyce commenced work at Aer Lingus, the flag carrier of Ireland. He held various positions in sales, marketing, information technology, network planning, operations research, revenue management and fleet planning. In 1996, he resigned to join the now-defunct Ansett Australia. In 2000, Joyce joined Qantas. At both Ansett Australia and Qantas, he headed the Network Planning, Schedules Planning and Network Strategy functions. Joyce was appointed CEO of Qantas subsidiary Jetstar Airways in October 2003.

CEO of Qantas
Joyce became CEO of Qantas on 28 November 2008. He is a former Director of Orangestar Investment Holdings Pte Limited (holding company of Singapore-based Jetstar Asia Airways and Valuair) and Jetstar Pacific Airlines Aviation Joint Stock Company (in Vietnam). On 29 October 2011, as a result of continuing industrial unrest following the announcement of job losses and structural changes at Qantas, Joyce grounded the entire Qantas mainline fleet.

The Australian named Joyce the most influential business leader in 2011. Yet a poll following his controversial 2011 grounding of the Qantas fleet showed the action has increased negative public perception of the airline. In 2011, Joyce's remuneration was increased 71 per cent from $2.92 million in 2009–10 to $5.01 million and he was granted 1.7 million Qantas shares under a long-term incentive plan. His reported comments that his salary was "conservative" were criticised by the Australian and International Pilots Association (AIPA).

In May 2019, Joyce committed to three more years as the chief executive of Qantas. In response to the COVID-19 pandemic, Joyce gave up his salary for the rest of the financial year.

Pieing incident
On 9 May 2017, Joyce was delivering a speech to a business breakfast event in Perth, when a lemon meringue pie was pushed into his face by an unknown assailant, later identified as Tony Overheu, a Western Australian farmer and Christian. Overheu, aged 67, gave a false name to police after the incident, but subsequently apologised for humiliating the CEO claiming that he pied the business figure due to his own personal belief that Joyce had overstepped the line in his gay marriage advocacy and the assailant's response simply reflected community push-back. Overheu was later charged with common assault, trespass, damage and giving false details to police. Along with being banished from his church, he was also banned from flying Qantas (including Qantas' partner airlines).

Overheu appeared before Perth Magistrates Court on 7 July 2017, pleaded guilty to charges of assault and trespass, damaging the lapel microphone Joyce was wearing, and giving a false name to police after the incident. Overheu was fined $3,600, as well as ordered to pay $269 in compensation for the lapel microphone and $188 in costs. Overheu's lawyer said his client had had "physical and personal difficulties" in recent years, including mental health issues.

LGBTI advocacy
Joyce, who is gay, supports the LGBTI community and personally donated $1 million towards the campaign to legalise same-sex marriage in Australia, which facilitated his own marriage in 2019. Joyce is the patron of the Pinnacle Foundation, an organisation which works with, "disadvantaged and marginalised LGBT Australians". For his work, he has been recognised on a global list of LGBT executives. As CEO, Joyce has pledged Qantas will "continue social-justice campaigning".

Honours and awards
 The Australian named Joyce the most influential business leader in 2011.
 Joyce is an Ambassador of the Australian Indigenous Education Foundation (AIEF).
 Joyce was named a Companion of the Order of Australia, Australia's highest civil honour, in the 2017 Queen's birthday honours list. This honour was awarded for "eminent service to the aviation transport industry, to the development of the national and international tourism sectors, to gender equity, inclusion and diversity, and to the community, particularly as a supporter of Indigenous education".

Personal life
Joyce identifies as being Catholic. In 2015, he became a member of the Australian Republic Movement, which argues that Australia should replace the monarchy to become a republic with an Australian head of state.

Joyce is openly gay (homosexual). In 2011, he was successfully treated for prostate cancer. On 2 November 2019, he and long-term New Zealander partner, Shane Lloyd, married on the rooftop of The Museum of Contemporary Art in Circular Quay. The couple live in the Rocks, an inner suburb of Sydney.

Controversies

Senate Inquiry on Airline Safety 2010-2011

Called to the Inquiry
In 2010 Independent Senator Nick Xenophon announced he was calling a Senate Inquiry on Airline Safety that focused on low-cost airline practices. He simultaneously called Alan Joyce to attend over a 2007 incident where a Jetstar A320 had accidentally come within 11-metres of the ground when Alan Joyce was Jetstar CEO.
On 17 September 2010 “The Australian” reported, ‘’INDEPENDENT senator Nick Xenophon will push for an urgent Senate inquiry into Australian aviation training and standards. This comes after a warning of a "race to the bottom" that has seen required flying experience for airline pilots plummet. Senator Xenophon also called for Qantas chief executive Alan Joyce and the airline's head of safety, John Gissing, to appear before a Senate committee to explain the circumstances behind a 2007 Jetstar incident in Melbourne...”

Promptly misled the Inquiry
On 25 February 2011, at his first hearing at the Senate Inquiry on “Pilot training and Airline safety” starting at 9am, Alan Joyce insisted safety was aligned in the Qantas Group. He closed his prepared opening statement with…. “Let me make this clear: at Jetstar there is no compromise on safety. The budget airline model does not require it, and we would never accept it. Qantas and Jetstar have different brands, but are completely aligned on safety. We would never compromise that. Thank you.”

However, this contradicted an ATSB report finding released 1-month earlier on 27 January 2011,
and further aired that same day by general media, on a 2009 Jetstar A330 Incident, JQ Flight 12, showing ATSB had found and fixed a systemic training deficiency in Jetstar due to its low-cost training policy, which wasn’t in Qantas mainline.

That training deficiency began in 2004 when Jetstar began using Airbus aircraft, A320’s, together with a standard low-cost airline practice of using outsourced pilot-funded training in this case provided by Boeing who as a training provider couldn’t access genuine updated Airbus Pilot manuals hence Jetstar A320 & A330 Airbus pilots for many years paid over 30,000 dollars upfront for deficient pilot manuals and related deficient simulator training.

In stark contrast, ATSB found the training deficiency was not in Qantas mainline using Airbus aircraft, A330’s, since 2002 and using genuine latest edition Airbus manuals directly obtained from Airbus Industries as their airline customer, with a standard policy of providing free internal training.

ATSB also found the 2009 JQ 12 A330 Incident with 214 people aboard that exposed the deficiency, encountered “unreliable Airspeed Indication” replicating the deadliest Airbus crash, Air France 447 an A330 with 228 fatalities, only 4-months earlier, after the same inflight icing conditions. In the Jetstar JQ 12 incident Jetstar’s training deficiency left only one of the 2 pilots onboard trained for that specific emergency procedure but done by Airbus “years ago” when working for another airline, who then performed it. In the case of Air France 447 BEA later found the specific emergency procedure wasn’t performed.

Promptly ignored the Inquiry
On 24 June 2011, 1-day after that Senate Inquiry ended and notably 1-week before Tiger Airways was grounded on its low-cost pilot training, the Sydney Morning Herald reported, “QANTAS and Jetstar intend to press ahead with their plans to fast-track relatively inexperienced co-pilots into airliner cockpits, despite a parliamentary inquiry yesterday finding against the practice.”

Incident with Simon Boikov
On 15 November 2022, Simeon Boikov, the leader of the Australian Cossacks, approached Joyce on George Street in Sydney and asked him why he prevented unvaccinated staff from working during the COVID-19 pandemic, before labelling him a "grub" and a "disgrace". (Joyce famously stood down unvaccinated staff, preventing them from earning an income, during the pandemic.) Footage of their interaction, captured by Boikov and later uploaded to YouTube, shows Joyce using profanity while speaking with Boikov. Joyce can be heard repeatedly telling Boikov to "piss off" and then to "fuck off", seemingly in direct contravention of "the Qantas Group Behaviours — Responsible, Respectful, Resilient and Excellence" and the company's "Code of Conduct and Ethics". Unsurprisingly, given Joyce's high-profile and status as an Order of Australia recipient, the incident received media coverage both nationally and abroad.

See also
 2011 industrial unrest and grounding of fleet
 2011 Qantas industrial disputes

References

External links
Qantas profile - Alan Joyce

|-

1966 births
20th-century Australian businesspeople
21st-century Australian businesspeople
20th-century Irish businesspeople
21st-century Irish businesspeople
Living people
Australian chief executives
Alumni of Trinity College Dublin
Alumni of Dublin Institute of Technology
Businesspeople from County Dublin
Fellows of the Australian Academy of Technological Sciences and Engineering
Naturalised citizens of Australia
Irish airline chief executives
Irish emigrants to Australia
Irish expatriates in Australia
Irish LGBT people
Qantas people
Australian LGBT businesspeople
Companions of the Order of Australia
21st-century LGBT people
Australian republicans